The 1959–60 Serie A season was won by Juventus.

Teams
Atalanta and Palermo had been promoted from Serie B.

Events
A modern professional structure was introduced, together with a third relegation.

Final classification

Results

Top goalscorers

References and sources

Almanacco Illustrato del Calcio - La Storia 1898-2004, Panini Edizioni, Modena, September 2005

External links
  - All results on RSSSF Website.

Serie A seasons
Italy
1959–60 in Italian football leagues